Od RTM do WTF is a novel by Slovenian author Asja Hrvatin. It was first published in 2008.

See also
List of Slovenian novels

Slovenian novels
2008 novels